Flax amita is a moth of the family Erebidae first described by Michael Fibiger in 2011. It is found in Indonesia (western Java).

The wingspan is about 13 mm. The forewings are light brown and the subterminal, terminal area and fringes are brown. There is a black-brown quadrangular patch in the upper medial area. The base of the costa is black brown, subapically with small black dots. The crosslines are indistinct brown. The terminal line is marked indistinctly with black-brown interveinal dots. The hindwings are grey with a discal spot. The underside of the forewings is unicolorous brown and the underside of the hindwings is grey with a discal spot.

References

Micronoctuini
Moths described in 2011